Al-Qasim is  a component of Arabic masculine names literally meaning "the one who distributes", see also "Qasim". Notable people whose full name includes "al-Qasim", "al-Qasem" , "al-Qassem", "al-Kasim", etc., include:

Al-Quasim
Al-Mansur al-Qasim
Al-Qasim ibn Hasan ibn Ali
Al-Qasim ibn Ubayd Allah
Samih al-Qasim
Al-Qasim ibn Muhammad
Al-Qasim Jannun (d. 949), Idrisid emir in northern Morocco 
Al-Qasim al-Ma'mun
Al-Qasim ibn Hasan ibn Ali
Al-Qasim ibn Ubayd Allah
Al-Mansur al-Qasim
Al-Qasim ibn Harun al-Rashid
Elham Al Qasim
Faisal al-Qasim
Al-Qasim al-Rassi
Al-Mukhtar al-Qasim
Al-Mutawakkil al-Qasim
Al-Mansur al-Qasim al-Iyyani

Other spellings
Faisal al-Qassem
Farouk Al-Kasim
Mohamed Al-Qasem

See also

Abu al-Qasim, "father of Al-Quasim"
Ibn al-Qasim, "son of Al-Quasim"

Arabic masculine given names